Leader by Destiny: George Washington, Man and Patriot is a biography of George Washington written for children by Jeanette Eaton. Illustrated by Jack Manley Rosé, it was first published in 1938 and was a Newbery Honor recipient in 1939.

References

1938 children's books
Children's history books
American children's books
Books about George Washington
Newbery Honor-winning works